Novoye Azmeyevo (Yañı Äzmey) is a rural locality (a village) in Diyashevsky Selsoviet, Bakalinsky District, Bashkortostan, Russia. The population was 77 as of 2010. There is 1 street.

Geography 
Novoye Azmeyevo is located 24 km west of Bakaly (the district's administrative centre) by road. Staroye Azmeyevo is the nearest rural locality.

References 

Rural localities in Bakalinsky District